Edith Mpolokeng Molikoe (born 23 May 2000) is a field hockey player from South Africa. In 2020, she was an athlete at the Summer Olympics.

Personal life
Edith Molikoe was born and raised in the Free State of South Africa. She later moved to Nelson Mandela Bay with her family, where she now resides in Gqeberha.

Molikoe is a former student of Woodridge College, and now studies at the University of Pretoria.

Career

Indoor hockey
In 2018, Molikoe made her indoor debut during a test series against Zimbabwe. She has gone on to represent the team in various test matches, as well as at the 2021 Indoor Africa Cup.

She was named to the South African U21 Invitational squad.

Field hockey
Despite never having made an international outdoor appearance, Molikoe was named to the South Africa squad for the 2020 Summer Olympics in Tokyo.

She made her outdoor debut on 24 July 2021, in the Pool A match against Ireland.

References

External links

2000 births
Living people
Female field hockey forwards
South African female field hockey players
Field hockey players at the 2020 Summer Olympics
Olympic field hockey players of South Africa
TuksHockey Club players
21st-century South African women
Field hockey players at the 2022 Commonwealth Games
2023 FIH Indoor Hockey World Cup players